The Creature is a 1924 German silent film directed by Siegfried Philippi and starring Charlotte Ander, Alfons Fryland, and Erich Kaiser-Titz.

The film's sets were designed by the art director Kurt Richter.

Cast

References

Bibliography

External links

1924 films
1920s German-language films
Films of the Weimar Republic
German silent feature films
Films directed by Siegfried Philippi
German black-and-white films
1920s German films